is the fourth single of J-pop duo FictionJunction Yuuka. It was released on September 22, 2005.

This single includes an insert song of the anime Mobile Suit Gundam SEED Destiny, composed by Yuki Kajiura. There are two other versions of the song on the single (hearty and instrumental), along with its karaoke version.  Its catalog number is VICL-35883. Coincidentally, the insert song of Gundam SEED (Gundam SEED Destiny's prequel), Akatsuki no Kuruma, was released exactly one year before this single.

This single peaked at #5 on the Oricon weekly charts but is the first single in voice acting history to hit #1 on the Oricon Daily Rankings.

Track listing

Charts 
Oricon Sales Chart (Japan)

External links 
Victor Animation Network: discography entry

References 

2005 singles
FictionJunction Yuuka songs
Songs written by Yuki Kajiura
2005 songs
Victor Entertainment singles
Song articles with missing songwriters